Linda Kazlauska (born 20 January 2000) is a Latvian footballer who plays as a forward for Sieviešu Futbola Līga club FK Iecava and the Latvia women's national team.

Club career
Kazlauska has played for FK Iecava in Latvia.

Club career
Kazlauska made her senior debut for Latvia on 12 August 2020 in a 0–1 friendly away loss to Estonia.

References

External links

2000 births
Living people
Latvian women's footballers
Women's association football forwards
Latvia women's youth international footballers
Latvia women's international footballers